Edith Mary Oldham Ellis (née Lees; 9 March 1861 – 14 September 1916) was an English writer and women's rights activist. She was married to the early sexologist Havelock Ellis.

Biography 

Ellis was born on 9 March 1861 in Newton, Lancashire. She was the only child of Samuel Oldham Lees, a landowner, and his wife Mary Laetitia, née Bancroft. She was born prematurely after her mother sustained a head injury during pregnancy and she died when Ellis was an infant. In December 1868, her father married Margaret Ann (Minnie) Faulkner and in time she had a younger half-brother. She did not get on well with her father or his new wife. She was educated at a convent school in 1873 until her father realised that she was taking a strong interest in the Catholic faith. She was removed from the school and sent to another.

She joined the Fellowship of the New Life and she briefly worked with Ramsay MacDonald when they both served as secretaries to the Fellowship. She met Havelock Ellis at a meeting in 1887. The couple married in November 1891.

From the beginning, their marriage was unconventional; she was openly lesbian and at the end of the honeymoon Ellis went back to his bachelor rooms. She had several affairs with women, which her husband was aware of. Their open marriage was the central subject in Havelock Ellis's autobiography, My Life (1939).

Her first novel, Seaweed: A Cornish Idyll, was published in 1898. During this period Edith began a relationship with Lily Kirkpatrick, an artist from Ireland who lived in St Ives. Edith was devastated when Lily died from Bright's disease in June 1903.
 
Ellis had a nervous breakdown in March 1916 and died of diabetes that September. She was cremated at Golders Green Crematorium. James Hinton: a Sketch, her biography of surgeon James Hinton, was published posthumously in 1918.

Works 
 
 My Cornish Neighbours (1906)
 Kit's Woman (U.S. title: Steve's Woman) (1907)
 The Subjection of Kezia (1908)
 Attainment (1909)
 Three Modern Seers (1910)
 The Imperishable Wing (1911)
 The Lover's Calendar: An Anthology (ed) (1912)
 Love-Acre (1914)
 Love in Danger (1915)
 The Mothers (1915) 
 
 The New Horizon in Love and Life (1921)

References

Further reading 
 
 

1861 births
1916 deaths
19th-century English women writers
19th-century English writers
19th-century English novelists
20th-century English women writers
20th-century English novelists
British women's rights activists
English feminists
English non-fiction writers
English women novelists
Lesbian feminists
British lesbian writers
Victorian novelists